Alexander Ross Wallace (27 September 1891 – 26 August 1982) was an English priest, colonial administrator, and author. He was the Dean of Exeter in the Church of England from 1950 to 1960.

Wallace was educated at Clifton and Corpus Christi College, Cambridge. He entered the Indian Civil Service in 1914 and when World War I came joined the 17th Cavalry. In 1922 he became a schoolmaster at Wellington College, Berkshire. From 1925 to 1930, he was Headmaster at Cargilfield School, Edinburgh . Further headships followed at Blundell's (1930–1933) and Sherborne (1934–1950) before his ordination in 1939. He was a Canon Residentiary at Salisbury Cathedral from 1942 to 1950 when he entered the Deanery.

References

1891 births
People educated at Clifton College
Alumni of Corpus Christi College, Cambridge
Heads of Blundell's School
Heads of schools in Scotland
Deans of Exeter
1982 deaths
Indian Civil Service (British India) officers
Heads of schools in England